Ballistic missile test and launch facility was built in the late 1950s and it is the oldest functioning ballistic missile installation in the developing world, located near Jabal Hamzah  west-northwest of Cairo.

History 
After Egypt's defeat in 1948 Arab-Israeli War, Egypt started the missile program and became interested in ballistic missiles after the presidency of Gamal Abdel Nasser and the 1956 Suez Crisis, as the importance of ballistic missiles had arisen to penetrate Israeli airspace.

Egypt attempted to acquire ballistic missiles from the Soviet Union but failed and then Egypt focused on the indigenous rocket program that was developed by German scientists based on German V-2, Wasserfall and the French Véronique rockets technology in 1960.

During the late 1950s, Egypt constructed the Jabal Hamzah ballistic missile facility to conduct test fires.

Chronology of events at Jabal Hamzah ballistic missile facility 
 July 1962 - four successful test flights of single stage, liquid fueled rockets of Al Zafir and Al Kahir SRBMs.
 23 September 1971 - launch of Al Kahir rocket.
 6 October 1973 - launch of Al Kahir rocket.

Overview 
In 2010, an analysis had been published using satellite imagery from commercial sources that shows between 2001 and 2009, Jabal Hamzah facility experienced an increase in activity and expansion as new constructions took place including a new missile launch pad and horizontal processing building.

See also 
 List of rocket launch sites

References 

Military of Egypt
Military installations of Egypt
Rocket launch sites